The Faith is an Australian rock band first formed in 1987. The members are vocalist Alan White, guitarist Jonathan Purcell, bass player Scott Millard and drummer Chris Briggs. Their music was influenced by bands as diverse as REM, the Cult, Television and the Velvet Underground. They were contemporaries of Died Pretty, Trilobites, Crash Politics, Candy Harlots, Bell Jar and The Screaming Tribesman.

History
The Faith was formed after Alan White and Chris Briggs wound up their former band Sons of Guns and joined forces with Scott Millard and Jonathan Purcell, both of whom had just finished up with Sydney band the Seamonsters. The Faith debut performance was in late 1987 supporting well-known local band Bell Jar at the Harold Park Hotel in Sydney's inner west. They were noticed straight away by their peers and quickly became a part of many local billings and line-ups throughout the next few months.

A new label called RooArt records noticed the band in 1987. The Faith were invited to record a track for RooArt's inaugural Youngblood compilation with leading producer Nick Mainsbridge at Sydney's Paradise Studios. 
After many more live dates and touring commitments, The Faith had the chance to return to the studio in December 1988 and record their debut album, Chain of Flowers.
Brett Myers, who was better known as the guitarist and songwriter for one Australia's most acclaimed international acts, Died Pretty, took the reins and produced the effort along with Tony Espie, ARIA award-winning engineer, at Studios 301 in Castlereagh St.
Chain of Flowers was released on the Survival Label, home to Screaming Tribesman, in December 1988 with the anticipation, it would become an independent hit. The album received enormous amounts of critical praise from street press around the country, however, radio failed to latch on, and inevitably record sales failed to match the expectations. Although sales were respectable for an independent release, it wasn't enough to guarantee interest from any of the major labels and the band lost momentum.

Break up
In the winter of 1989 and following the release of Chain of Flowers, the band took a forced hiatus as Alan White pursued his film directing career in the United States, and at the same time Scott Millard filled in with appearances with the Candy Harlots.  The band came together and toured in late 1989 however eventually different visions of the future forced the band to call it quits and no further material was released.
The band reformed to record some demo's in 1990 with a new lineup. Scott Millard had since moved on. The sessions, with Alex Ronayne on bass, yielded one track "Wild Changes" which was finally mixed some nine years later and released on the 1999 soundtrack of the Australian movie "Erskineville Kings", which was released on Scott Millard's Air Recordings Label.

Post break up
The 1990 sessions were to be the last time the Faith were to play together. Alan White continued his career in film and went on direct some of the world's most popular TV commercials and in 1999 released his first feature film, Erskineville Kings, starring Hugh Jackman. This was shortly followed by Risk, with Bryan Brown and the 2007 film Broken  with Heather Graham. His last feature film was 2014's Reclaim with John Cusack and Ryan Phillipe. He also directed the US TV series Technology Jones. Alan now lives in Los Angeles.

Scott Millard left The Faith and briefly joined the Candy Harlots thence Crash Politics, Bell Jar, ID (Mushroom Records), and Clusterfunk (members of Crash Politics). After a break from playing rock-based music, he released a solo vinyl ep under the name Crackerjack, produced by Paul Mac, which was reproduced in its entirety on Sony Music's "Itch-E and Scratch-E and Friends" album (1994). In 1999 he formed the record label Air Recordings that featured Australian artists such as Nick Barker, The Blue Hour, Lime, Halo Effect, and FC Europa. Since 2000, Scott has pursued a career in the games industry where he served as Managing Director of Namco Bandai in Singapore and Korea, and since 2019 serves as Managing Director for games publisher Feardemic in Poland.

Jonathan Purcell went on to play with ID (non-concurrent to Scott Millard's stint) and a career in taxation where he is now a GST legal interpretations advisor. Jonathan has recorded with Tegan Northwood on her new CD released on the Endgame Label in 2007. Jonathan was also a member of Mark Easton's band Soggy Porridge in the mid-1980s and appears on their compilation CD 'Broken Romance'. Jonathan resides in Sydney.

Chris Briggs, originally a professional skateboarder in the early 80s, joined Sydney grunge band Earwig in 1992. Earwig won "Best New Band" in the Sandringham Hotel's "Battle of the Bands" in 1992, however, did not record any material. He now resides in Brisbane.

Reformed
The Faith reunited in December 2008 to record their second album "Gone Forever". The first song lifted from the as yet to be released album is a track titled "Surreal Eyes". This track was debuted on their MySpace page in October 2009. Videos to "Surreal Eyes", and another two tracks from the same forthcoming album, "Anytime" and "The Bulrushes" (a cover of the Bongo's track) have been uploaded to YouTube.

Discography
Album Compilation – RooArt presents YoungBlood, RooArt/Polygram January 1988 Track 2 – Heaven. Catalogue Number 836 109-82 (USA)
Album – The Faith, Chain of Flowers, Survival Records, December 1988 Catalogue Number RAT 1214 (AUS)
Album Compilation – Survival of the Fittest, Track 11 – Virginia RykoDisc 1990, Catalogue Number RCD20110 (USA),(CANADA)
Album Soundtrack – Erskineville Kings. Air Recordings 1999, MGM Distribution, Catalogue Number AIR18 (AUS)
Digital Download – "Surreal Eyes". Independent, 2009. First track from forthcoming album "Gone Forever"
Video Only (YouTube)- "Anytime". Independent, 2010. Second track from forthcoming album "Gone Forever"
Video Only (YouTube)- "The Bulrushes". Independent, 2010. Third track from forthcoming album "Gone Forever"

Advertising campaigns
The Faith contributed the soundtracks to the award-winning Homer Hudson ice cream commercials, cited by Rolling Stone magazine as the hottest advertising campaign of the year (1988 – Hot Issue). The money earned for the session actually financed the recording of the Chain of Flowers album.

Video clips
Heaven – from RooArt presents Youngblood
Red Light – from the Chain of Flowers album.
Surreal Eyes – from the Gone Forever album (2010).
Anytime – from the Gone Forever album(2010).
The Bulrushes – from the Gone Forever album(2010).
"Faded Heart"-from the Gone Forever album(2011).

External links
https://www.imdb.com/name/nm0924429/

Australian rock music groups